Tenille Jade Dakota Arts (born April 19, 1994) is a Canadian country music singer from Weyburn, Saskatchewan. She released a self-titled extended play and her debut studio album Rebel Child with 19th & Grand Records before signing a joint record deal with indie label Reviver Records in 2018. Her first album under that deal, Love, Heartbreak, & Everything in Between, was released in January 2020. Arts was nominated for the Discovery Artist Award by the Canadian Country Music Association in 2016 and has received multiple awards from the Saskatchewan Country Music Association. She released her third studio album Girl to Girl in October 2021 on 19th & Grand. Arts is currently signed to Dreamcatcher Artists.

Biography 
Arts was raised in her hometown of Weyburn, Saskatchewan, where she began taking lessons in piano and singing, and developed an interest in songwriting in her teenage years. By 2009, she began posting videos of her cover versions of popular songs, including one of Taylor Swift's "Fifteen" that captured the attention of a talent manager from Nashville, Tennessee. Arts briefly relocated to Nashville to pursue this opportunity, but returned to Canada to finish high school. In 2015, she relocated to Nashville to sign a publishing contract with Noble Vision Music Group and released "Breathe", a charity single in support of Cystic Fibrosis research.

She was awarded the Emerging Artists Award from the Saskatchewan Country Music Association and was nominated for the Discovery Artist program from the Canadian Country Music Association, both in 2016, for her burgeoning success. That year, she released her debut, self-titled extended play through the independent label imprint 19th & Grand Records. "What He's Into" was released to Canadian country radio in January 2017 as her official debut single and reached 47 on the Canada Country airplay chart. Following the success of that record, Arts released her debut studio album, Rebel Child, on October 27, 2017, preceded by the single, "Cold Feet". The album reached number 45 on the sales component chart of the Billboard Top Country Albums chart.

In 2018, Arts made an appearance on the 22nd season of popular American reality television series, The Bachelor, performing an original ballad titled, "Moment of Weakness" and in 2020 performing “Somebody Like That”. Exposure from the show led to increased interest in Arts's music and a record deal from indie label Reviver Records, which she signed in March 2018. A deluxe edition of Rebel Child was issued that year with new tracks including "Moment of Weakness". Her first release for Reviver, "I Hate This", was released in the summer of 2018 and charted on the Hot Country Songs in the United States. A Canadian-exclusive single, "Mad Crazy Love", became Arts's second single to reach the Canadian country airplay charts. Two further singles were released in 2019 - "Call You Names" and "Somebody Like That" - to promote her second studio album, Love, Heartbreak, & Everything in Between, which was released on January 10, 2020. 

On October  22, 2021, Arts released her third studio album Girl to Girl, which included the singles "Give It to Me Straight" and "Back Then, Right Now". In 2022, Arts signed with Dreamcatcher Artists as the flagship artist on their label. As part of the deal, Dreamcatcher acquired her entire catalogue and released the new single "Jealous of Myself". Arts is set to join Lee Brice on his early 2023 "Beer Drinking Opportunity Tour" in Canada along with Josh Ross.

Discography

Albums

Extended plays

Singles

Promotional singles

Music videos

Awards and nominations

Notes

References

External links 
 Official website

Living people
Canadian women country singers
1994 births
21st-century Canadian women singers
Musicians from Saskatchewan
Canadian Country Music Association Rising Star Award winners